Jerry Lorenzo Manuel Sr. (born December 23, 1953), nicknamed "The Sage," is a former major league manager. He previously managed the Chicago White Sox from 1998 to 2003 and the New York Mets from the middle of 2008 to 2010 and played in the majors for parts of five seasons in the 1970s and early 1980s. He now works as an analyst for MLB Network. He is the father of fashion designer Jerry Lorenzo, founder of the streetwear label Fear of God.

Playing career
Manuel played sparingly in the major leagues from 1975 to 1982, mostly as a second baseman. He accumulated only 127 at bats and a .150 batting average with three home runs and 13 RBIs in 96 games. Although his major league playing career was brief, Manuel was the starting second baseman for the Montréal Expos in their only postseason series victory in 1981. He was 1-for-14 (.071) in the series and was replaced by Rodney Scott in the NLCS.

Other than Montréal, Manuel played for the Detroit Tigers and the San Diego Padres  and ultimately retired in 1984.

In 1972, Manuel and Mike Ondina became the first pair of high school teammates to be drafted in the first round of a Major League draft. Both attended Cordova High School in Rancho Cordova, California. Manuel played just under 100 games.

Coaching and managerial career
Manuel held a variety of coaching positions over the next six years. He was originally hired by the Chicago White Sox in 1985 to scout Northern California. He left the White Sox the following year to join the Montréal Expos organization, a team with which he would remain associated for the next 11 years. In 1986, Manuel joined the Expos' Triple-A affiliate, the Indianapolis Indians of the American Association, as a player/coach. Manuel spent the next three years as the Expos' roving infield instructor (1987) and their minor league field coordinator (1988–89). In 1990, Manuel became a manager for the first time as he was named the manager of the Southern League's Jacksonville Expos, the Expos' Double-A affiliate. He led the team to an 84–60 record and was named the league's manager of the year.

1991–2003
Following a successful season at Double-A, Manuel was elevated to Triple-A to manage the Indianapolis Indians for the 1991 season. Midway through the campaign, he was brought up to Montréal to serve as the third base coach for the Expos, ending a minor league managing career in which Manuel compiled a 112–82 record. He remained the Expos' third base coach through the 1996 season. In 1997, he moved on to the Florida Marlins, where he became a bench coach under Jim Leyland. The team went on to win the 1997 World Series. Days after the World Series victory, Manuel's father, Lorenzo Manuel, died. Over one month later, in December, Manuel signed a multi-year deal to manage the Chicago White Sox. Over the next six seasons, he amassed 500 wins and led the Sox to 95 in 2000 alone. In that season, Manuel guided the White Sox to a first-place finish in the American League's Central Division and was named the American League's Manager of the Year. Following the 2003 season, Manuel was replaced as White Sox manager by Ozzie Guillén.

His 2003 Topps baseball card reads:
"Jerry has a philosophical air about him that makes him a sage influence and respected leader on his teams. After six seasons directing the White Sox fortunes, he's risen to fourth on the franchise's managerial wins list. Formerly, he was a pro player for 15 years and 12-year coach/Minor League manager. Manuel and Ken Williams form the first African-American GM/manager tandem in MLB history."

New York Mets (2005–2010)

Coach

After departing the White Sox, Manuel joined the New York Mets organization in 2005 as the first base and outfield coach under new manager Willie Randolph. Manuel became Randolph's bench coach in 2006, a position he remained in until 2008.

Ever since he was fired by the White Sox, Manuel wanted to manage again. In February 2007, he announced a contingency plan as he was introduced as the man who would lead the formation of a baseball program at William Jessup University, an NAIA school in Rocklin, California. He said he would manage the team when it started in 2009 if he did not get another managing job.

Manager
On June 17, 2008, Willie Randolph, pitching coach Rick Peterson, and first base coach Tom Nieto were fired by the Mets. Omar Minaya announced Manuel as the interim manager, while Ken Oberkfell, Dan Warthen, and Luis Aguayo were brought up from the New Orleans Zephyrs (the then-Mets' Triple-A affiliate) to fill the remaining coaching vacancies.

In 2008, the Mets were unable to hold a division lead, and ultimately the Philadelphia Phillies clinched the division on September 27. The Mets were then eliminated from the National League Wild Card berth the following day when the team lost to the Florida Marlins 4–2 in the final game at Shea Stadium.

On October 3, 2008, Manuel agreed to a two-year deal to remain the Mets manager. The deal included a club option for a third year.

On October 4, 2010, the Mets announced that both Manuel and general manager Omar Minaya would not return for the 2011 season.

Managerial record

Post-MLB career
After leaving Major League Baseball, Manuel went back to his home in the Sacramento area and started the Jerry Manuel Foundation to "Educate African American young men with charter school standards and train them in the fundamentals of baseball."

On January 16, 2014, it was announced that Manuel would be brought on as the Director of Baseball Operations at William Jessup University in Rocklin, California.

Manuel served as a bench coach for Team USA during the 2023 World Baseball Classic.

References

Further reading

External links

 Jerry Manuel at Pura Pelota (Venezuelan Professional Baseball League)

1953 births
Living people
People from Hahira, Georgia
People from Rancho Cordova, California
African-American baseball coaches
African-American baseball managers
African-American baseball players
American expatriate baseball players in Canada
Baseball coaches from California
Baseball coaches from Georgia (U.S. state)
Baseball players from California
Baseball players from Georgia (U.S. state)
Bristol Tigers players
Chicago White Sox managers
Chicago White Sox scouts
Denver Bears players
Denver Zephyrs players
Detroit Tigers players
Evansville Triplets players
Florida Marlins coaches
Hawaii Islanders players
Indianapolis Indians managers
Indianapolis Indians players
Iowa Cubs players
Lakeland Tigers players
Leones del Caracas players
American expatriate baseball players in Venezuela
Major League Baseball bench coaches
Major League Baseball first base coaches
Major League Baseball second basemen
Major League Baseball third base coaches
Manager of the Year Award winners
MLB Network personalities
Montreal Expos coaches
Montreal Expos players
New York Mets coaches
New York Mets managers
San Diego Padres players
St. Lucie Legends players
Tiburones de La Guaira players
Toledo Mud Hens players
Wichita Aeros players
21st-century African-American people
20th-century African-American sportspeople